The Great Lakes Colleges Association (GLCA) is a consortium of 13 liberal arts colleges located in the states around the Great Lakes. The GLCA's offices are located in Ann Arbor, Michigan and its 13 schools are located in Michigan, Ohio, Pennsylvania and Indiana. It was chartered in the state of Michigan and incorporated as a 501(c)(3) non-profit organization in 1962.  Its stated mission is to take actions that will help strengthen and preserve its colleges, being a leading force on behalf of education in the tradition of the liberal arts and sciences.

The organization is the founder and administrator of the Global Liberal Arts Alliance.

Operations
GLCA operates a Tuition Remission Exchange involving its 13 colleges plus Beloit College, Grinnell College, Willamette University, and Wittenberg University, by which students eligible for tuition remission because of parental employment at one of the colleges will receive tuition remission at any one of the other colleges in the Exchange.

GLCA awards three literary prizes annually to a poet, a fiction writer, and a creative nonfiction writer to honor their first books. Winning authors receive all-expense-paid trips to several of GLCA’s member colleges, at which they will be paid an honorarium of at least $500 to meet with students, give readings, and lead discussions.

The Philadelphia Center, which offers an off-campus study program with the opportunity to gain college credit while living and learning independently in Philadelphia, Pennsylvania, is managed and operated by Albion College in partnership with the GLCA.

The consortium extended its first offer of membership in 46 years to Allegheny College in 2008.

Member institutions
The GLCA's member institutions are:
Albion College
Allegheny College
Antioch College
Denison University
DePauw University
Earlham College
Hope College
Kalamazoo College
Kenyon College
Oberlin College
Ohio Wesleyan University
Wabash College
College of Wooster

External links

References

College and university associations and consortia in the United States
.
Organizations based in Ann Arbor, Michigan